Simon Taylor may refer to:

People
Simon Taylor (artist) (born 1969), English artist 
Simon Taylor (footballer, born 1970), Australian rules footballer who played for the Collingwood Football Club
Simon Taylor (footballer, born 1982), Australian rules footballer who played for the Hawthorn Football Club
Simon Taylor (journalist) (born 1944), British motor sport writer and editor
Simon Taylor (musician), drummer for InMe
Simon Taylor (rugby union) (born 1979), Scottish rugby union footballer
Simon Taylor (sugar planter) (1739–1813), British sugar planter in Jamaica
Simon Watson Taylor (surrealist) (1923–2005), British actor and translator
Simon Watson Taylor (landowner) (1811–1902), English landowner and politician

Other
Simon Taylor (ship), convict ship to Western Australia